Móveis Coloniais de Acaju (usually referred to as simply Móveis) are a Brazilian-based band comprising ten members, including singer André Gonzáles, keyboardist Eduardo Borém, and bassist Fabio Pedroza. The band's name literally translated means "colonial mahogany wood-made furniture".

The Acaju Rebellion 
According to Fabrício Ofuji, the name of the band is an homage to a fictitious rebellion that supposedly happened when English troops invaded Bananal Island, in the Northern Region of Brazil.

English troops invaded and settled down on the island, where they started making furniture out of Cedrela odorata, commonly known as “Acaju”. When the Portuguese discovered the invasion, they gathered slaves, indigenous people and other Portuguese to kick out the invaders.

The Portuguese forces are successful, and decide to burn the colonial furniture that belonged to the invaders as a celebration of their victory.

Discography

Albums
 2005 - Idem (sold by Amazon as "Moveis Coloniais de Acaju") 
 2009 - C_mpl_te
 2013 - De Lá Até Aqui

Singles
 2006 - Seria o Rolex?
 2007 - Sem Palavras (free digital release) 
 2009 - O Tempo (free digital release) 
 2009 - Falso Retrato (U-HU) (free digital release) 
 2009 - Projeto Tamar: 30 anos (free digital release)

EPs
 2001 - Móveis Coloniais de Acaju (EP) 
 2007 - Vai Thomaz no Acaju (with Gabriel Thomaz from Autoramas)

See also
Jota Quest
Pato Fu
Skank
Los Hermanos
Brazilian rock

References

External links
Official site

Musical groups established in 1998
Brazilian indie rock groups
Musicians from Brasília
1998 establishments in Brazil